Leaf Trading Cards, founded in 2010, is a private company that produces trading cards and sports collectibles. Based in Dallas, Texas, it was best known as a producer of sports cards and other lithographic products.

The sports range covered by Leaf include American football, baseball, basketball, ice hockey, soccer, Professional wrestling and tennis.

History
The company was founded in 2010 by Brian Gray in Dallas, Texas.  Previously, Gray had headed Razor Entertainment, a manufacturer of sports trading cards best known for signing the number one pick in the 2008 MLB draft, Tim Beckham, to an exclusive autograph deal.

After Gray acquired the rights to the Leaf brand name, Razor was immediately shuttered and Gray re-launched the company as "Leaf Trading Cards".  Like Razor before it, Leaf does not currently have a license with any of the four major US sports leagues or their respective players' unions.  Instead, Leaf has concentrated producing cards of up-and-coming prospects and on niche sports like mixed martial arts and professional poker.  

In 2011, Leaf came to terms with Muhammad Ali to produce a 100-card set based on the fighter's career.  Leaf also has a license to produce cards based on the TV series Family Guy.

Leaf Trading Cards have been making professional wrestling cards since 2012.

The current Leaf Trading Cards has no connection to the gum and card manufacturer of the 1940s and 50s, nor is it related in any way to Donruss, Pinnacle Brands, or Playoff, Inc., all of which produced sports trading cards under the "Leaf" name in the 1980s, 1990s and 2000s.

References

External links
 

Manufacturing companies based in Dallas
Trading card companies
Manufacturing companies established in 2010
American companies established in 2010